The 15006 / 05 Dehradun–Gorakhpur Express is an Express train belonging to Indian Railways – North Eastern Railway zone that runs between  & Gorakhpur Junction in India.

It operates as train number 15006 from Dehradun to Gorakhpur Junction and as train number 15005 in the reverse direction serving the states of Uttarakhand & Uttar Pradesh.

Coaches

The 15006 / 05 Dehradun–Gorakhpur Express has 1 AC 2 tier, 5 AC 3 tier, 6 Sleeper Class, 4 General Unreserved 1EOG & 1 SLR (Seating cum Luggage Rake) coaches. It does not carry a pantry car.

As is customary with most train services in India, coach composition may be amended at the discretion of Indian Railways depending on demand.

Service

The 15006 Dehradun–Gorakhpur Express covers the distance of 815 kilometres in 16 hours 25 mins (49.64 km/hr) & in 16 hours 50 mins as 15005 Gorakhpur–Dehradun Express (48.42 km/hr).

Routeing

The 15006 / 05 Dehradun–Gorakhpur Junction Express runs from Dehradun via Haridwar Junction, Lucknow NR, Gonda Junction,  to Gorakhpur Junction.

Traction

As the route is yet to be fully electrified, a Lucknow or Gonda-based WDM-3A hauls the train for its entire journey

Timings

15006 Dehradun–Gorakhpur Express leaves Dehradun every Tuesday & Thursday at 15:30 hrs IST and reaches Gorakhpur Junction at 07:55 hrs IST the next day.

15005 Gorakhpur–Dehradun Express leaves Gorakhpur Junction every Wednesday & Friday at 21:10 hrs IST and reaches Dehradun at 14:00 hrs IST the next day.

References 

 https://www.youtube.com/watch?v=rpaKtqH-kA8
 http://dehradun.askalo.in/ID_100667075/What-are-the-major-trains-to-dehradun.html
 http://timesofindia.indiatimes.com/city/lucknow/Gorakhpur-yard-remodeling-to-affect-several-trains/articleshow/21824240.cms
 https://www.flickr.com/photos/55998266@N08/8373667422/

External links

Trains from Dehradun
Express trains in India
Passenger trains originating from Gorakhpur